Richard Whitney (born 1946 in Vermont), is an American painter, author and educator. Town & Country magazine has named him one of the top dozen portrait painters in America. Fine Art Connoisseur has called him one of "the giants of the field" of figurative painting. Whitney's portraits and landscapes hang in over 800 public and private fine art collections worldwide. They include the Anchorage Museum of Art and History; the Anderson House Museum; the Newark Museum; the Pentagon; Harvard, Yale, and Stanford universities; and the Catholic University of Portugal. He has won over 40 regional and national awards as well as three grants from the Elizabeth Greenshields Foundation of Montreal. Whitney was awarded an Honorary Doctor of Fine Arts from the University of New Hampshire in 2015.

Whitney is the author of the book Painting the Visual Impression which summarizes the basic principles of representational painting. First published in 1972, it has been read by thousands of artists world-wide. He is also a co-author of the book Realism in Revolution: The Art of the Boston School. His paintings have also been reproduced in the book Edmund C. Tarbell and the Boston School of Painting.

Whitney graduated Phi Beta Kappa from the University of New Hampshire in 1968. He studied with Sidney F. Willis and with the eminent Boston painter R. H. Ives Gammell for five years. Whitney's paintings have been seen on national cable television and have been the subject of numerous newspaper and magazine articles. He has traveled and painted in Europe, Japan, Alaska and the Caribbean and has lectured and conducted workshops throughout the United States. He is listed in many reference books, including Who's Who in American Art, Who's Who in America, and Who's Who in the 21st Century.  Whitney and his artist wife Sandy Sherman live on Crescent Pond in Stoddard, New Hampshire.

Professional organizations
Allied Artists of America - Honorary Lifetime Member
American Artists Professional League - Honorary Lifetime Member
American Society of Portrait Artists - Chairman Emeritus
American Society of Classical Realism
Copley Society - Copley Master
The Guild of Boston Artists

Awards, honors
1970 - 1973
Three Grants - Elizabeth T. Greenshields Memorial Foundation – Montreal

1975
Third Gold Medal - Jordan Marsh Show - Boston

1976
Merit Award – Springfield (MA) Art League National Exhibition
Excellence Award in Traditional - Cape Cod Art Association All New England
Exhibition Three Awards – Ogunquit (ME) Art Center National Exhibition
Anonymous Award in Oil - Knickerbocker Artists National Exhibition – New York City

1977
Grumbacher Award in Oils - Academic Artists National Exhibition – New York City
First in Oil - Cape Cod Art Association All New England Exhibition

1978
Finalist - American Artist Magazine National Art Competition – New York City

1980
Yankee Sagendorph Award - Copley Society of Boston
Honorable Mention - Jubilee 350 Competition for New England Artists - Boston
The Crescent Gallery, Ltd. Award - Allied Artists National Exhibition – New York City

1982
The Margaret Fitzhugh Browne Memorial Portrait Award - Copley Society of Boston
Cover Artist - "American Artist" Magazine - April

1983
Grumbacher Gold Medal - Guild of Boston Artists Competition

1984
Gold Medal - American Artist Professional League Grand National Exhibition – NYC
Copley Master Award - Copley Society of Boston
Juror's Choice Award – Springville (Utah) Museum of Art National Salon Show
American Portrait Society Certification - Los Angeles

1986
Juror's Choice Award - Springville Museum of Art National Salon Show
Dole Award - American Artists Professional League Grand National Exhibition

1987
Silver Medal - The Society of Illustrators' 29th Annual Exhibition – New York City
A. Lassell Ripley Award - Guild of Boston Artists Competition
Medal "Benemerito" - Catholic University of Portugal

1990
Commendation - Governor and Executive Council of New Hampshire

1991
Ken Gore Memorial Award - Guild of Boston Artists Competition

1999
R. H. Ives Gammell Award – Guild of Boston Artists Competition

2000
American Artist magazine article - April

2002
Edmund C. Tarbell Award – Guild of Boston Artists Spring Awards Exhibit
Emeritus Award – American Society of Portrait Artists

2011
Honorable Mention, Landscape – Art Renewal Center International Salon

2013
Elected Honorary Lifetime Member of the American Artists Professional League and Allied Artists of America

2015
Honorary Doctor of Fine Arts - University of New Hampshire

2017
 Lifetime Membership to the Copley Society of Art
 Honorable Mention, Portraiture - Art Renewal Center International Salon
 Albert Nelson Marquis Lifetime Achievement Award - Who's Who in America
 Lotte Jacobi Living Treasure Award - NH Governor's Arts Awards

2018 
 Who's Who in the World

Exhibits
(From a list of over 800 public and private collections)

Newark Museum of Art
Springville Museum of Art
Knights of Columbus Museum
The Pentagon
New Hampshire State House
Woods Hole Oceanographic Institution
Catholic University of Portugal
University of Chicago
Boston University School of Medicine
Yale School of Medicine
Stanford University School of Medicine
Saint Anselm College
Franklin Pierce University
University of Charleston
Furman University
New England College of Optometry
Brooklyn Academy of Music
Massachusetts General Hospital
Brigham and Women's Hospital
South Shore Hospital
Chubb Life America
New England Historic Genealogical Society
Sailors Snug Harbor, Sea Level, NC
Preservation Society of Newport County, RI
South Congregational Church, New Britain, CT
Unitarian Church, Worcester, MA
Pine Crest School
Berkshire School
St. Johnsbury Academy
The Governor's Academy
Loomis Chaffee School
Wheeler School
Data Resources Inc.
Heublein, Inc.
New England Insurance Company
Quincy Mutual Fire Insurance Company
New Hampshire Ball Bearings, Inc.
Raveneaux Country Club, Houston
South Shore Bank, Quincy, MA
Skowhegan Bank, Skowhegan, ME
Bank of New Hampshire
Alain Briottet, French Ambassador to Finland
Kevin B. Harrington, Massachusetts Senate President
Dickie, McCamey & Chilcote, Pittsburgh
Carroll Jones, Jr., Life magazine illustrator
Mr. & Mrs. John J. Shields, III
Alfred J. Walker, art dealer
William A. Coles, art historian
Jan Mitchell, benefactor, Metropolitan Museum of Art
Tanio Nakamura, curator, Tokyo National Museum
Takezo Hirato, retired CEO, Mazda Yokohama
Sekiya Shirayama, Tokyo
Anchorage Historical and Fine Arts Museum
Anderson House Museum, Washington, DC
AFL–CIO, Washington, DC
United States Department of Labor, Washington, DC
Massachusetts State House
New Hampshire Supreme Court
Strafford County (NH) Superior Court
Massachusetts Eye and Ear Infirmary
King Edward VII Memorial Hospital, Bermuda
Harvard University
Massachusetts Institute of Technology
Dartmouth College
St. Johns College
Ohio State University Moritz College of Law
Northeastern University
Suffolk University
Mount Ida College
Keene State College
Mt. Sinai Hospital
Institute of Living, Hartford, CT
Evangelical Theological Seminary Library, Osijek, Croatia
Unitarian Universalist Association of America
First Parish Church, Weston, MA
Community Church Society, Pepperell, MA
Mercersburg Academy
Pingree School
Cushing Academy
Dublin School
Eaglebrook School
Robert J. Coelho Middle School, Attleboro, MA
Stanadyne Corporation
National Grange Mutual Insurance Company
Hartford Steam Boiler Inspection and Insurance Company
The Little Susitna Company, Anchorage
Battelle Corporation
Sallie Mae
C&S Corporation
The Inn at Sawmill Farm, West Dover, VT
Beech Hill Farm Hospital, Dublin, NH
The late US Senator Thomas J. McIntyre
The Honorable Edward J. McCormack, Jr.
John H. Sununu, former White House Chief of Staff
Helena Hale, actress
Frederick Hart, Vietnam Memorial sculptor
John Cunningham, VP, Wang Laboratories
Bruce Ferguson, developer of Pegasus rocket
Mr. & Mrs. Frederick C. Ross, noted collectors
A. Ara Danikian, art dealer
Abbot Williams Vose, art dealer
A. Sadeghi-Nejad, former Minister of Culture of Iran
Yasuyuki Nambu, Japanese entrepreneur, Tokyo
Chieko Yamagata, Tokyo

Gallery of work

External links

Personal website
 http://www.richardwhitneyportraits.com

20th-century American painters
American male painters
21st-century American painters
21st-century American male artists
American portrait painters
1946 births
Living people
University of New Hampshire alumni
Painters from New Hampshire
People from Stoddard, New Hampshire
20th-century American male artists